Senator Cannon may refer to:

Members of the United States Senate
Frank J. Cannon (1859–1933), U.S. Senator from Utah from 1896 to 1899
Howard Cannon (1912–2002), U.S. Senator from Nevada from 1959 to 1983

United States state senate members
Edwin Bennion Cannon (1910–1963), Utah State Senate
Franklin Cannon (1794–1863), Missouri State Senate
George Mousley Cannon (1861–1937), Utah State Senate
James E. Cannon (1873–1942), Virginia State Senate
Martha Hughes Cannon (1857–1932), Utah State Senate
Newton Cannon (1781–1841), Tennessee State Senate